Dehesa Elementary School District  is a public school district located in the rural East County area of San Diego County, California, United States. It consists of one school serving grades kindergarten through 8th grade, including TK/EAK.

About
The superintendent is Bradley Johnson. The district is governed by an elected five-member board. The principal is Jholei Evans.

Dehesa School is a Computer Science Immersion Academy and a "No Excuses University".

The computer science curriculum for grades K-6 is divided into trimesters. The first trimester is Scratch (entry-level coding). The second trimester is robotics building and programming using Lego Mindstorm EV3 Robots. The third trimester is Minecraft coding, where students learn to program using the Java language. The curriculum for 7th and 8th graders focuses on HTML5, CSS, Javascript, and Python using a program called Codesters. Every trimester ends in an "Epic Build" where students showcase their work to their families.

Founded on April 5, 1876, it is one of the oldest school districts in San Diego County.

References

External links
 

School districts in San Diego County, California
1876 establishments in California
School districts established in 1876